Ritual Aesthetic is an American industrial band founded in 2013 based in Denver, Colorado, United States.

History
Ritual Aesthetic began in 2013 as the solo project of Sean Ragan who was then drumming for Metropolis Records industrial horror outfit Dawn Of Ashes.  The band's original style consisted of genre-blending compositions similar to that of artists like Skinny Puppy. The resulting sound was a unique blend of melodic dance rhythms, harsh metal guitar, aggressive EBM styled vocals and dark experimental noise atmospheres.

In early 2013, individual singles were uploaded to the band's various social media pages. Met with overwhelmingly positive feedback from online listeners, the band signed with UK industrial label Juggernaut Services and on April 18, 2014 released its subsequent first full length  Decollect .  The album featured brand new compositions, re-workings of original singles as well as remixes by Ad Noiseam artist Iszoloscope.  Decollect was mixed by Los Angeles-based heavy metal producer Alex Crescioni and mastered by the German producer Sander Kapper

Decollect has been praised with critical acclaim, drawing comparisons to Wumpscut, Combichrist and Ministry.  Critics praised Ritual Aesthetic's unique and heavy musical compositions as well as praising its catchy pop structured lyrical hooks, and referred to their debut album as sounding as if it came from "the 1995 heyday of the genre". The album was ranked #14 on Discogs Best Industrial Albums of 2014 category, as well as #7 in its Best Alternative Electronic Albums of 2014 list.

In Spring 2018, the band announced via Regen Magazine that the band signed with Cleopatra Records and would be releasing 2018's follow up album Wound Garden in late July.  Accompanying the press announcement was a teaser single of the song "The Analog Flesh".  Wound Garden was released on July 28, 2018 with the group's debut music video directed by videographer Vicente Cordero premiering exclusively on Sideline Magazine.

On January 15, 2020, the band announced via Brutal Resonance magazine that they were aiming to release a new album in 2020, with Chris Vrenna as creative collaborator and producer.  In a July interview, frontman Sean Ragan stated that due to the COVID-19 pandemic, the album had been delayed to Spring 2021.

Discography
Something To Know You By (2013) Single
Decollect (2013) LP
Wound Garden (2018) LP
Blood of the Titans - Ritual Aesthetic Remix (2021) - Remix for Dawn of Ashes' EP Blood of the Titans (Remixes)

Members
Sean Ragan
Vance Valenzuela
Mack Barrow
Nicholas Klinger

References

American industrial metal musical groups
Musical groups from Denver
Musical groups established in 2013
Musical quartets
Electronic music groups from Colorado
2013 establishments in Colorado